Yorba Foundation was a non-profit software group based in San Francisco, and founded by Adam Dingle wanting to bring first class software to the open source community. This organization had been created to answer people thinking open source brings hard to use, clunky and low-quality software usable only by hackers.

The company was made of 5 employees: Jim Nelson (coder and executive director), Adam Dingle (founder), Charles Lindsay, Eric Gregory and Nate Lillich (software engineers).

History 

In December 2009, Yorba Foundation applied to get the 501(c)(3) status. After some requests for clarification by IRS in 2010 and 2011, Yorba received on May 22, 2014 a denial for that tax exemption status. The reason for the rejection, explained by IRS, is that the organization makes software that can be used by any person for any purpose, and not for a specific community. Therefore, Yorba cannot be considered as a charity while the Apache Foundation, with exactly the same purpose, is considered as-it. Although this status would have helped, according to Jim Nelson, this deny does not hinge on Yorba existence.

On October 31, 2013, Yorba moved from San Francisco's Mission District to the Financial District down the hill from Chinatown, still in San Francisco.

In April 2015, at the end of the month, the last Yorba employee, Jim Nelson, left the foundation. The reason for the end of activity is lack of being financially sustainable: funding ran out, donations did not match expenses and even if Yorba had received the 501(c)(3) status allowing to be tax exempted, they would still have probably to shut the project down.

On October 25, 2015, the following message was posted on their webpage without any further explanations:

May 2016 marked the completion of the process to begin the formal dissolution of the organization. The complete dissolution should happen later in 2016.

In May 2016, Yorba assigned the copyright of all these pieces of software to Software Freedom Conservancy except California which will be assigned in the near future due to an oversight on Yorba's part.

Main developments 

 Shotwell, an image organizer for the Linux operating system
 Geary, a free email client written in Vala
 Valencia, a plugin for gedit to help with coding in the Vala programming language
 gexiv2 GObject wrapper around Exiv2
 California, a GNOME 3 calendar application

References 

Organizations established in 2009
Free software project foundations in the United States
Non-profit organizations based in San Francisco
2009 establishments in California
Defunct non-profit organizations based in the United States
2015 disestablishments in California
Organizations disestablished in 2015